The Solid Concepts 1911 DMLS  is a 3D printed improvised firearm version of the M1911 pistol. It was made public around November 2013 and was printed via the direct metal laser sintering (DMLS) method. It was created by Solid Concepts.  The first gun, version 1.0, is made up of 34 3D-printed 17-4 stainless steel components.

Specifications 

It weighs  when it is empty i.e is not filled with a magazine and the trigger pull weighs . The ratio of the twist is 1:15.8; at 6=Lands 6=Grooves. The gun used Inconel 625 (a nickel-chromium alloy) material and stainless steel via the Direct Metal Laser Sintering method.

The Solid Concepts Browning M1911 replica, version 2.0, will be composed of 34 Inconel 625 components, (not including grips). The two carbon-fiber filled nylon 12 grips were also 3D printed. Unlike early 3D printed plastic guns, the barrel of the 1911 was rifled. None of the parts were machined during production, and assembly took less than seven minutes once the parts had been filed and hardened.

Printer
The German EOSINT M270 Direct Metal 3D Printer used to create the weapon cost between $500,000 to $1,000,000 at the time the gun was created as of November 2013 and uses a commercial-grade power source. The printer requires argon and nitrogen gas

Capability and firing tests
According to Sky News, during the initial test Solid Concepts stated: "It functions beautifully. Our resident gun expert has fired 50 successful rounds and hit a few bull's eyes at over 30 yards (27.43 metres)". 
The Solid Concepts Pistol fired its 5000th round on 6 September 2014.

See also
List of 3D printed weapons and parts

References

3D printed firearms
.45 ACP semi-automatic pistols
1911 platform
Semi-automatic pistols of the United States